Coisopacana (possibly from Quechua quysu, qhuysu a very long skirt, pakana hiding place) is a mountain in the Vilcabamba mountain range in the Andes of Peru, about  high. It is located in the Cusco Region, La Convención Province, Vilcabamba District. Coisopacana lies southwest of Pumasillo, southeast of  Panta and north of the Apurimac River.

References

Mountains of Peru
Mountains of Cusco Region